Governor Conway may refer to:

Elias Nelson Conway (1812–1892), 5th Governor of Arkansas
Henry Seymour Conway (1721–1795), Governor of Jersey from 1772 to 1795
James Sevier Conway (1798–1855), 1st Governor of Arkansas
Thomas Conway (1735–1800), Governor of French colonies in India from 1787 to 1789
William B. Conway (1802–1839), Acting Governor of Iowa Territory